Norman Thomas Armstrong (2 July 1925 – 18 May 2015) was an Australian rules footballer who played with Footscray in the Victorian Football League (VFL).

Notes

External links 		
		
		
		
		
		

1925 births
2015 deaths
Australian rules footballers from Victoria (Australia)		
Western Bulldogs players
Braybrook Football Club players